Iakov Ivanovich Rostovtsev ( – ) was a leading figure in the formulation of statutes which effectively emancipated the Russian serfs.

Biography 
Born in St Petersburg, Russia, Rostovtsev became a career soldier, and was a young officer at the time of the 1825 Decembrist revolt.  When he was invited to join the plot, he instead reported it to Tsar Nicholas I, though without revealing the names of the officers involved.

Rostovtsev went on to hold posts in military education, and was involved in the administration of the cadet corps, reaching the rank of Full General.

In 1857, when the Tsar made public his plans under the Nazimov Rescript to reform the institution of serfdom, Rostovtsev was appointed to the Editing Commission charged with developing those plans, after a conservative leaning secret commission found Emancipation to be impossible.  His subsequent report was well received, and brought him the chairmanship of the Commission whose task was to draft the necessary statutes.

The resulting statutes were issued on 19 February 1861, a year after Rostovtsev's death. On that occasion Rostovtsev's widow and children were made Counts of the Russian Empire.

References 

Panlog article

1804 births
1860 deaths
Russian nobility
Military personnel from Saint Petersburg
Military personnel of the Russian Empire
Politicians of the Russian Empire
Burials at the Feodorovskaya Church of the Alexander Nevsky Lavra